Off Sides (Pigs vs. Freaks) (originally titled Pigs vs. Freaks) is a 1984 American made-for-television sports comedy film. Based on a short film by Jack Epps Jr., the feature-length film was scheduled for release in 1980 but was not actually released until 1984. Directed by Dick Lowry, it stars Eugene Roche, Grant Goodeve and Tony Randall. It was broadcast on television, not released as a theatrical feature.

Plot summary
In the late 1960s in a small town, a police chief and his hippie son lead opposing football teams to settle their differences. The police ("Pigs") play against the hippies ("Freaks").

Cast
 Eugene Roche as Chief Frank Brockmeyer
 Grant Goodeve as Neal Brockmeyer
 Tony Randall as Rambaba Organimus
 Adam Baldwin as Mickey South
 Penny Peyser as Janice Zimmer
 Brian Dennehy as Sergeant Cheever
 Stephen Furst as "Steamboat"
 Gloria De Haven as Maureen Brockmeyer
 Patrick Swayze as Doug Zimmer
 William Windom as Mayor Malcolm Wallwood
 Chieko Araki as Debby Brockmeyer
 Charlie Bloom as Creekmore
 Dave Cass as Keough
 Elisha Cook as Novatney
 Jack Eiseman as Cochran
 Jim Greenleaf as Blatz
 J. D. Hall as Riley Webster
 Curtis F. Hanson as FBI Agent #1
 Tom Harmon as Game Announcer
 Lanny Horn as Morton
 Graham Jarvis as Commander Oliver Krebs
 Holly Johnson as Reporter
 Joe Kapp as Pete Bose
 Priscilla Lauris as Mom
 Tom Martin as "Chow-Chow" Gedrechowski
 Alan Oliney as Fishbeck
 Shari Santilli as Emily Wallwood
 Pat Studstill as "Mad Dog" Osloff
 Shauna Sullivan as Kim
 Robina Suwol as Pig Wife
 Vern Taylor as Pop
 Brad Wilkin as Ben Grimaldi
 Eugenia Wright as Didi
 Roger Edmonds as Football Official 1

Crew
Frank Beascoechea: Director of Photography
Gordon Dawson: Screenwriter
Jack Epps, Jr.: Writer, original story; Producer
Duane Toler: Script Supervisor
Robert Lovenheim: Supervising Producer
Robert Huddleston: Producer
Mark Snow: Music
Dale Johnston: Sound Editor
Caro Jones: Casting

Production
The film was based on a 1970 short film by Jack Epps Jr. which won a Blue Ribbon from the American Film Institute. The story was based on a real-life softball game with a similar premise in 1970. Mostly filmed in Salem, Oregon.

It was also an annual charity football game between East Lansing police and students at Michigan State University.

Notes

External links

1984 television films
1984 films
1980s sports films
American television films
American football films
Features based on short films
Films scored by Mark Snow
Films set in the 1960s
Films shot in Oregon
Hippie films
Softball mass media
Films directed by Dick Lowry
1980s English-language films
1980s American films